Filip Bajić (born 18 November 1993) is a Serbian football forward.

Career

Dinami Vranje
Bajić joined FK Dinamo Vranje in the summer 2019. In January 2020 it was confirmed, that Bajić had left the club.

References

External links
 
 
 

1993 births
Living people
Footballers from Novi Sad
Association football forwards
Serbian footballers
RFK Novi Sad 1921 players
FK Inđija players
OFK Bačka players
FK Napredak Kruševac players
OFK Bečej 1918 players
FK Dinamo Vranje players
Serbian First League players
Serbian SuperLiga players